Kardagushevo (Qarźağoş) is a rural locality (a village) in Kudashevsky Selsoviet, Tatyshlinsky District, Bashkortostan, Russia. The population was 214 as of 2010. There are 4 streets.

Geography 
Kardagushevo is located 18 km west of Verkhniye Tatyshly (the district's administrative centre) by road. 1-y Yanaul is the nearest rural locality.

References 

Rural localities in Tatyshlinsky District